The Last Deadly Mission, also known as MR 73, is a 2008 French film noir written and directed by Olivier Marchal.

Synopsis 
Louis Schneider is a French law enforcer who serves in the French Judiciary Police Regional Service. He is assigned to detect a serial killer and tries to live up to his superior's expectations. But then it is brought to his notice that a convict called Charles Subra will be released early for he pretends he had found God and he would now deeply regrets his former bad deeds. Schneider doesn't believe any of it. Neither does Justine, whose parents were once murdered by Subra. Justine teams up with Schneider because she knows he brought Subra to justice once before. She hopes he can do it again although he is an alcoholic.

Background
The film title refers to a revolver made in France: Manurhin MR 73

Reception
The film received mixed reviews but Daniel Auteuil's performance was praised unequivocally.

Cast 
 Daniel Auteuil: Louis Schneider
 Olivia Bonamy: Justine Maxence
 Catherine Marchal: Marie Angéli
 Francis Renaud: Kovalski
 Gérald Laroche: Matéo
 Guy Lecluyse: Jumbo
 Philippe Nahon: Charles Subra
 Grégory Gadebois: Young Charles Subra
Clément Michu: Émile Maxence, Justine's grandfather
Moussa Maaskri: Ringwald 
Christian Mazzuchini: Roques 
Louise Monot: Blandine 
Maxim Nucci: Richard 
Valéry Zeitoun: Maître Lomach 
Yasmine Lafitte: the prostitute 
Anne Charrier: the veterinarian

References

External links
 
 
 

2008 films
2000s French-language films
2000s crime films
French crime films
Films directed by Olivier Marchal
French neo-noir films
Police detective films
2000s French films